Ebselen (also called PZ 51, DR3305, and SPI-1005), is a synthetic organoselenium drug molecule with anti-inflammatory, anti-oxidant and cytoprotective activity. It acts as a mimic of glutathione peroxidase and can also react with peroxynitrite. It is being investigated as a possible treatment for reperfusion injury and stroke, Ménière's disease, hearing loss and tinnitus, and bipolar disorder.

Additionally, ebselen may be effective against Clostridioides difficile infections and has been shown to have antifungal activity against Aspergillus fumigatus.

Ebselen is a potent scavenger of hydrogen peroxide as well as hydroperoxides including membrane bound phospholipid and cholesterylester hydroperoxides. Several ebselen analogs have been shown to scavenge hydrogen peroxide in the presence of thiols.

Possible anti-COVID-19 activity 
Preliminary studies demonstrate that Ebselen exhibits promising inhibitory activity against COVID-19 in cell-based assays. The effect was attributed to irreversible inhibition of the main protease via a covalent bond formation with the thiol group of the active center's cysteine (Cys-145).

Synthesis 
Generally, synthesis of the characteristic scaffold of ebselen, the benzoisoselenazolone ring system, can be achieved either through reaction of primary amines (RNH2) with 2-(chloroseleno)benzoyl chloride (Route I), by ortho-lithiation of benzanilides followed by oxidative cyclization (Route II) mediated by cupric bromide (CuBr2),  or through the efficient Cu-catalyzed selenation / heterocyclization of o-halobenzamides, a methodology developed by Kumar et al. (Route III).

References 

Organoselenium compounds
SARS-CoV-2 main protease inhibitors
Selenium heterocycles
Nitrogen heterocycles
Heterocyclic compounds with 2 rings